The following are official state symbols of the Indian state of Kerala.

References

State symbols
Kerala